The title Duke of Queensberry was created in the Peerage of Scotland on 3 February 1684 along with the subsidiary title Marquess of Dumfriesshire for the 1st Marquess of Queensberry. The Dukedom was held along with the Marquessate of Queensberry until the death of the 4th Duke (and 5th Marquess) in 1810, when the Marquessate was inherited by Sir Charles Douglas of Kelhead, 5th Baronet, while the Dukedom was inherited by the 3rd Duke of Buccleuch. Since then the title of Duke of Queensberry has been held by the Dukes of Buccleuch.

In 1708 the 2nd Duke was created Duke of Dover (along with the subsidiary titles Marquess of Beverley and Baron Ripon) in the Peerage of Great Britain, but these titles became extinct upon the death of the 2nd Duke of Dover in 1778. In 1945, King George VI offered Winston Churchill the title of Duke of Dover, which he declined.

Several subsidiary titles are associated with the Dukedom of Queensberry, namely Marquess of Dumfriesshire (1683), Earl of Drumlanrig and Sanquhar (1682), Viscount of Nith, Tortholwald and Ross (1682) and Lord Douglas of Kilmount, Middlebie and Dornock (1682) (all in the Peerage of Scotland).

The seat of the Dukes is at Drumlanrig Castle, built by the 1st Duke of Queensberry.

Dukes of Queensberry (1684)
Other titles: Marquess of Dumfriesshire, Earl of Drumlanrig and Sanquhar, Viscount of Nith, Torthorwald and Ross and Lord Douglas of Kilmount, Middlebie and Dornock (1684)
Other titles (1st to 4th Dukes): Marquess of Queensberry (1682), Earl of Queensberry (1633), Earl of Drumlanrig and Sanquhar (1682), Viscount of Drumlanrig (1628), Viscount of Nith, Torthorwald and Ross (1682), Lord Douglas of Hawick and Tibbers (1628) and Lord Douglas of Kilmount, Middlebie and Dornock (1682)
William Douglas, 1st Duke of Queensberry (1637–1695) was, until February 1684, merely Marquess of Queensberry
James Douglas, 2nd Duke of Queensberry, 1st Duke of Dover (1662–1711), eldest son of the 1st Duke
Other titles: Duke of Dover, Marquess of Beverley and Baron Ripon (1708)
William Douglas, Earl of Drumlanrig (1696), eldest son of the 2nd Duke, died in infancy
James Douglas, 3rd Marquess of Queensberry (1697–1715), second son of the 2nd Duke, was an imbecile and was excluded from the succession to the dukedom only by a charter of novodamus and then died without issue
Other titles (3rd Duke): Earl of Solway, Viscount Tibbers and Lord Douglas of Lockerby, Dalveen and Thornhill (1706)

Charles Douglas, 3rd Duke of Queensberry, 2nd Duke of Dover (1698–1778), third son of the 2nd Duke, succeeded his father due to special remainder and died without issue
Henry Douglas, Earl of Drumlanrig (1722–1754), elder son of the 3rd Duke, died without issue
Charles Douglas, Earl of Drumlanrig (1726–1756), younger son of the 3rd Duke, died without issue
Other titles (4th Duke): Earl of Ruglen (1697), Earl of March (1697), Viscount of Riccartoun (1697), Viscount of Peebles (1697), Lord Hillhouse (1697), Lord Douglas of Neidpath, Lyne and Munard (1697) and Baron Douglas, of Amesbury in the county of Wiltshire (GB, 1786)
William Douglas, 4th Duke of Queensberry (1724–1810), great-grandson of the 1st Duke via the Earls of March
Other titles (5th Duke onwards): Duke of Buccleuch (1663), Earl of Buccleuch (1619), Earl of Doncaster, in the county of York (En 1663, restored 1743), Earl of Dalkeith (1663), Lord Scott of Buccleuch (1606), Baron Scott of Whitchester and Eskdaill (1619), Baron Scott of Tindall, in the county of Northumberland (En 1663, restored 1743) and Lord Scott of Whitchester and Eskdale (1663)
Henry Scott, 3rd Duke of Buccleuch, 5th Duke of Queensberry (1746–1812), great-grandson of the 2nd Duke of Queensberry
George Scott, Earl of Dalkeith (1768), eldest son of the 3rd Duke of Buccleuch, died in infancy
Charles William Henry Montagu-Scott, 4th Duke of Buccleuch, 6th Duke of Queensberry (1772–1819), second son of the 3rd Duke
George Henry Scott, Lord Scott of Whitchester (1798–1808), eldest son of the 4th Duke, died young
Walter Francis Montagu Douglas Scott, 5th Duke of Buccleuch, 7th Duke of Queensberry (1806–1884), second son of the 4th Duke
William Henry Walter Montagu Douglas Scott, 6th Duke of Buccleuch, 8th Duke of Queensberry (1831–1914), eldest son of the 5th Duke
Walter Henry Montagu Douglas Scott, Earl of Dalkeith (1861–1886), eldest son of the 6th Duke, died unmarried
John Charles Montagu Douglas Scott, 7th Duke of Buccleuch, 9th Duke of Queensberry (1864–1935), second son of the 6th Duke
Walter John Montagu Douglas Scott, 8th Duke of Buccleuch, 10th Duke of Queensberry (1894–1973), eldest son of the 7th Duke
Walter Francis John Montagu Douglas Scott, 9th Duke of Buccleuch, 11th Duke of Queensberry (1923–2007), only son of the 8th Duke
Richard Walter John Montagu Douglas Scott, 10th Duke of Buccleuch, 12th Duke of Queensberry (born 1954), eldest son of the 9th Duke

Coat of arms

Family Tree

See also
 Marquess of Queensberry

References

Dukedoms in the Peerage of Scotland
1684 establishments in Scotland
Peerages created with special remainders
Noble titles created in 1684
Dukes of Queensberry